Pender v Lushington (1877) 6 Ch D 70 is a leading case in UK company law, which confirms that a company member's right to vote may not be interfered with, because it is a right of property. Furthermore, any interference leads to a personal right of a member to sue in his own name to enforce his right. As Lord Jessel MR put it, a member:

Facts
The articles of association of the Direct United States Cable Company Ltd, registered under the Companies Act 1862 provided that no member would be allowed to vote on more than 100 shares at any meeting, and each block of ten shares was counted as one vote. It also provided that "the company shall not be affected with notice of any trust", a standard provision in company articles that is meant to allow companies to avoid complications or liability to the ultimate beneficiaries of shares.

Mr John Pender had bought 1000 shares. He was also chairman of Globe Telegraph and Trust Company Ltd, a holding company of a large group with competitors to the Direct United States Cable Company. Mr Pender had split his votes and registered the holders under the names of a number of nominees. After more than three months he then proposed the following motion at a general meeting.

“That it is expedient to put an end to the present antagonism of this company towards the Anglo-American Telegraph Company and its connections, and to work this company's cable in friendly alliance with their lines; and that a committee of shareholders be appointed to be named by the meeting to confer with the directors as to the best method of giving effect to this resolution, and to report to the shareholders thereon at such time as the meeting shall appoint.”

The opponents to the motion, including the company's directors and the chairman, Mr Lushington, proposed to amend the resolution so it had the opposite effect. Mr Pender and his nominees voted against any amendment and would have won if the votes of the nominees were counted. But Mr Lushington refused to have the nominees votes counted. He, along with other supporters of the motion sued for an injunction.

Judgment
Lord Jessel MR held that Pender could have an injunction for his vote to be recorded. Pender's vote was a property right which could not be interfered with, nor were the motives in this case such as to make the vote invalid. Furthermore, as a matter of litigation, Pender could sue in the name of the company, as well as in his own name. Interference with a personal right created both a derivative claim and a personal action.

See also

UK company law
UK public service law
Ashby v White (1703) 92 ER 126
Allen v Gold Reefs of West Africa Ltd [1900] 1 Ch 656, shareholders must, however, cast their votes bona fide for the benefit of the company as a whole
Andrews v Gas Meter Company [1897] 1 Ch 361
Isle of Wight Railway Company v Tahourdin (1884) LR 25 Ch D 320

Notes

References

United Kingdom company case law
1877 in case law
1877 in British law
Court of Appeal (England and Wales) cases